Definite Article is the title of British comedian Eddie Izzard's 1996 performance, which was released on VHS and later on DVD. It was recorded on different nights at the Shaftesbury Theatre. Both, recordings cover topics such as The Italian Job, Pavlov's dogs and European languages.

Trivia
At the beginning of the show, Eddie arrives on stage through a huge book which opens to reveal her sitting at the top of a staircase. The backdrop then closes and from then on, the background changes at various intervals with words from selected literature projected onto the pages of the huge book. The chosen selections are:

 A Marriage Proposal (a.k.a. The Proposal) - Anton Chekhov
 Jabberwocky - Lewis Carroll
 Macbeth - Shakespeare
 Mayor of Casterbridge - Thomas Hardy
 Edward II - Christopher Marlowe

External links
 Definite Article - article at The Official Eddie Izzard Site
 
 The Cake or Death Site

Eddie Izzard albums
Stand-up comedy albums
Spoken word albums by English artists
Stand-up comedy concert films
1996 video albums
1996 live albums
Live video albums
1990s comedy albums